NCES may refer to:

National Center for Education Statistics, part of the U.S. Department of Education
Net-Centric Enterprise Services, a United States Department of Defense program
Normal curve equivalents, a type of scale score based on the normal curve

See also 
 NCE (disambiguation)